Tearing at the Seams is the second studio album by American band Nathan Rateliff & The Night Sweats. It was released on March 9, 2018 under Stax Records.

Songs

Singles
The single "You Worry Me" was released on January 11, 2018, along with the announcement of the new album. The song charted at Number 1 on Billboard's Canada Rock, number 1 on Adult Alternative Songs, number 18 on Hot Rock & Alternative Songs,

On October 21, 2018, the music video to "A Little Honey" was released. The song charted at Number 2 on Billboard's Adult Alternative Songs, The song was performed live on Jimmy Kimmel Live! on September 6, 2018.

"Hey Mama" was released as a music video on May 9, 2018. The song charted at Number 1 on Billboard's Adult Alternative Songs,

Lyrics 
Rateliff told Vincent Arrieta of The Buffalo News that while he is generally hesitant to divulge the origins and meanings of songs, he did reveal that "Babe I Know" was at least partly inspired by his divorce, saying "I was kind of going through a lot in my personal time and trying to write about that situation and without being too revealing. The words of that whole song [are] sort of like saying goodbye to somebody, but also recognizing that I just wasn't receiving what I really needed – which was to be blown away by somebody and breathless around the person you care about.”

Critical reception
Tearing at the Seams was met with "generally favorable" reviews from critics. At Metacritic, which assigns a weighted average rating out of 100 to reviews from mainstream publications, this release received an average score of 78, based on 11 reviews. Aggregator Album of the Year gave the release a 72 out of 100 based on a critical consensus of 7 reviews.

Stephen Thomas Erlewine of AllMusic said the album "feels very much like a record worked out on the road. It's filled with high-octane grooves and gritty vamps, punctuated by the occasional moment of acoustic reflection. Often, the vibe trumps the songs, which is actually not much of a problem. The Night Sweats know how to re-create classic soul sounds."

Track listing

Charts

Weekly charts

Year-end charts

Personnel

Musicians
 Nathaniel Rateliff – vocals, guitar
 Jeff Dazey – saxophone
 Andreas Wild – saxophone, vocals
 Jess Wolfe – backing vocals
 Mark Shusterman – vocals, piano
 Luke Mossman – guitar
 Joseph Pope III – bass
 Scott Frock – flugelhorn
 Holly Laessig – backing vocals
 Patrick Meese – bass, drums, engineer

Production
 Richard Swift – engineer, producer, vocals
 Christopher Colbert – mastering
 Jamie Mefford – engineer, producer
 Rett Rogers – photography

References

2018 albums
Nathaniel Rateliff albums